Thomas Henaughen (25 July 1930 – 6 May 2017) was a Scottish professional footballer who made over 130 appearances in the Scottish League for Kilmarnock as a forward.

Career 
Henaughen played in the Scottish League for Queen's Park and Morton and was capped by Scotland at amateur level. After his retirement from football, Henaughen worked as a scout for Kilmarnock.

Personal life
Henaughen attended St Mungo's Academy. He died on 6 May 2017, at the age of 86, at Erskine Care Home, Edinburgh. Henaughen's wife of 62 years, Margaret, died four days later.

Honours
Kilmarnock
 Scottish League Second Division second-place promotion: 1953–54

Career statistics

References

1930 births
2017 deaths
Association football forwards
Greenock Morton F.C. players
Kilmarnock F.C. players
People educated at St Mungo's Academy
Queen's Park F.C. players
Scottish Football League players
Scottish footballers
Soccer players from New Jersey
Tonbridge Angels F.C. players
Southern Football League players
Scotland amateur international footballers
Kilmarnock F.C. non-playing staff